The High Council of Justice of Georgia is the supreme oversight body in charge of regulating the judiciary in Georgia. It was established on 13 June 1997.

The High Council of Justice is tasked with ensuring the independence and efficiency of the common courts, appointing and dismissing judges and performing other tasks defined by the law. As of the 2018 constitutional amendments, the Council consists of 14 members appointed for a term of 4 years and the Chairperson of the Supreme Court. More than half of the members are elected from among the judges by the self-governing body of judges of the common courts. In addition, one member is appointed by the President of Georgia and the remaining members are elected by a majority of at least three fifths of the total number of the Members of Parliament. The Chairperson of the High Council of Justice is elected for a 4-year term by the High Council of Justice from among its judge members.

References 

Government of Georgia (country)
Law of Georgia (country)
1997 establishments in Georgia (country)
Courts and tribunals established in 1997